In the mythology of Tahiti, Pua Tu Tahi was one of the giant monster clam of the deep in the legend of Rata.

Bibliography
R.D. Craig, Dictionary of Polynesian Mythology (Greenwood Press: New York, 1989), 217;
T. Henry, Ancient Tahiti (Bernice P. Bishop Museum: Honolulu, 1928), 469-95

External links

The story of Rata

Tahiti and Society Islands mythology
Polynesian legendary creatures